The fibular notch of the tibia is an indentation at the inferior portion of the tibia where it articulates with the fibula to form the inferior tibiofibular articulation.

Additional images

Bones of the lower limb
Tibia